The Invisible Thread is a 2022 Italian comedy-drama film directed by Marco Simon Puccioni, written by Luca De Bei and Marco Simon Puccioni and starring Filippo Timi, Francesco Scianna and Francesco Gheghi.

Plot
The story is seen through the eyes of Leone, who is working on a school project about LGBT rights in Europe, based on none other than his own, personal experience. Whilst also in the throes of first love with his beautiful school friend Anna, Leone is forced to accept that his “beautiful family” isn’t quite as perfect as it seems. And so, caught between prejudiced views of homosexuality as hereditary, a raft of misunderstandings, civil battles, and various twists and turns, our young man – whose suffering is clear as day and is no different from that felt by any other youngster whose parents split up – finds himself thinking about the “invisible thread” which binds him to his two dads and to all those who brought him into the world.

Cast 
 Filippo Timi as Paolo Ferrari
 Francesco Scianna as Simone Lavia
 Francesco Gheghi as Leone Ferrari
 Giulia Maenza as Anna Del Monte
 Jodhi May as Tilly Nolan
 Valentina Cervi as Monica Ferrari
 Emanuele Maria Di Stefano as Jacopo Venosa
 Matteo Oscar Giuggioli as Dario Del Monte
 Mauro Conte as Riccardo Morselli
 Alessia Giuliani as Elisa Del Monte
 Gerald Tyler as Leroy Liotta
 Enrico Borello as Receptionist
 Gianluca De Marchi as Domenico Moretti

Release
The film is available on Netflix.

References

External links
 
 

2022 films
2022 comedy-drama films
2022 LGBT-related films
Italian LGBT-related films
Italian coming-of-age comedy-drama films
2020s Italian-language films
Italian-language Netflix original films
2020s Italian films
LGBT-related coming-of-age films
Films about father–son relationships